Mekalmaradi is a village in Belgaum district of Karnataka, India.

References

External links
 Mekalmaradi Village's Map, India Village Directory.

Villages in Belagavi district